Walton railway station is located in Walton cantonment, Lahore district of Punjab province of the Pakistan. It is named after Sir Cusach Walton, son of Frederick Walton.

History
In March 1930, a training school of North West Railways, now known as Pakistan Railways Academy, was founded which was inaugurated by the then Governor of the Punjab, Sir Geoffrey Fitzhervey de Montmorency.

Incidents 
Terrorist incidents in Pakistan in 1998
On the Tuesday morning, 10 March 1998, a bomb blast occurred here in a Lahore-bound train killing at least 10 and wounding more than 80 people. State authorities described the bomb as a timing device that was planted at an earlier stop. Although, no one claimed responsibility but Pakistan's government blamed the attack on its neighbor India.

See also
 List of railway stations in Pakistan
 Pakistan Railways

References

External links

Buildings and structures in Lahore
Railway stations in Lahore District
Transport in Lahore
Railway stations on Karachi–Peshawar Line (ML 1)